The Universal Car Company, at 2500 W. Broadway in the California neighborhood of Louisville, Kentucky, was built in 1923.  It was listed on the National Register of Historic Places in 2001.

It is a two-story brick building.  Also known as the Universal Chevrolet Company Building, it was one of Louisville's first dedicated new car sales showrooms.

See also 
 Third Street Motor Car Company Building: NRHP listing in Newport, Kentucky
 National Register of Historic Places listings in Louisville's West End

References

National Register of Historic Places in Louisville, Kentucky

Commercial buildings completed in 1923
Transportation buildings and structures in Louisville, Kentucky
1923 establishments in Kentucky
Commercial buildings on the National Register of Historic Places in Kentucky
Chevrolet
Auto dealerships on the National Register of Historic Places
Late 19th and Early 20th Century American Movements architecture